Richard Fletcher Pride III (born July 15, 1969) is an American professional golfer who plays on the PGA Tour Champions. He previously played on the PGA Tour and the Korn Ferry Tour.

Early life

Pride was born in Tuscaloosa, Alabama. He attended Tuscaloosa Academy and the University of Alabama, where he was a member of the golf team. Pride was named All-Southeastern Conference his junior and senior years. At Alabama, he was a member of Delta Kappa Epsilon fraternity. He was a semifinalist at the 1991 U.S. Amateur. He turned professional in 1992 and played in that season's U.S. Open, where he missed the cut.

Professional career

Pride became a full-time PGA Tour member after his finish at the 1993 qualifying school. Pride earned his only win to date at the 1994 Federal Express St. Jude Classic, his 19th PGA Tour start. He won that event with a birdie on the first extra hole of a playoff against Hal Sutton and Gene Sauers. His best finish in a major was a tie for 28th at the 2003 U.S. Open.

Pride developed severe health problems in 2002 (gall bladder, pancreatitis, plantar fasciitis, broken bones) which severely limited his playing time. For the next decade, he split his playing time between the PGA Tour and the Nationwide Tour. He lives in Orlando, Florida, but remains an avid Crimson Tide fan.

In 2011, Pride was actively fund-raising for Alabama natives affected by the tornado that hit his hometown of Tuscaloosa. Playing in the past champion category (which is near the bottom of the PGA Tour exemption priority list), Pride started his 2012 season with two consecutive top-ten finishes, a T-5 at the Mayakoba Golf Classic and T7 at the Honda Classic. Pride had his best finish since his only PGA Tour win at the 2012 HP Byron Nelson Championship, finishing second to Jason Dufner. He was tied for the lead on the 72nd hole, but hit his tee shot into the water hazard on the left, but saved par with a 22-foot putt after a good approach shot. Dufner holed a 25-foot birdie putt from a similar position on the green to deny Pride his first victory in almost 18 years (a win would have established a PGA Tour record for longest time between wins, beating Robert Gamez by over two years). Overall, Pride played in 19 events, made 12 cuts, earned $1,259,712, played in three stages of the FedEx Cup, and finished 70th on the 2012 money list, earning a full Tour card for 2013 and entry into invitational tournaments reserved for the top 70 money earners. At age 43, 2013 marked the first time since 1999 that Pride was fully exempt on the PGA Tour.

Pride was unable to follow up on his 2012 season and spent much of 2014 and 2015 on the Web.com Tour. He nearly regained his PGA Tour card during the 2014 Web.com Tour Finals, but missed the cut in the last event and finished outside the Top 50. He won the last regular season event during the 2015 season, jumping from 40th to fifth on the money list for his first professional win in 21 years and earning a PGA Tour card for the 2015–16 season.

In May 2021, Pride won the Mitsubishi Electric Classic at TPC Sugarloaf near Atlanta, Georgia. This was his first win on the 50 and over PGA Tour Champions. Pride won the tournament by three strokes after Monday qualifying into the tournament.

Professional wins (3)

PGA Tour wins (1)

PGA Tour playoff record (1–0)

Web.com Tour wins (1)

PGA Tour Champions wins (1)

PGA Tour Champions playoff record (0–1)

Results in major championships

CUT = missed the half-way cut
"T" = tied
Note: Pride never played in The Open Championship.

Results in The Players Championship

"T" = Tied
CUT = missed the halfway cut

Results in senior major championships

"T" indicates a tie for a place
NT = No tournament due to COVID-19 pandemic

See also
1993 PGA Tour Qualifying School graduates
1997 PGA Tour Qualifying School graduates
1998 PGA Tour Qualifying School graduates
2000 PGA Tour Qualifying School graduates
2006 PGA Tour Qualifying School graduates
2015 Web.com Tour Finals graduates

References

External links

American male golfers
Alabama Crimson Tide men's golfers
PGA Tour golfers
PGA Tour Champions golfers
Korn Ferry Tour graduates
Golfers from Alabama
Golfers from Orlando, Florida
Sportspeople from Tuscaloosa, Alabama
1969 births
Living people